The History of measurement systems in Pakistan begins in early Indus Valley civilization when pastoral societies used barter to exchange goods or services and needed units of measurement.

The System of measurement is a set of units of measurement which can be used to specify anything which can be measured and were historically important, regulated and defined because of trade and internal commerce. In modern systems of measurement, some quantities are designated as base units, meaning all other needed units can be derived from them, whereas in the early and most historic eras, the units were given by fiat (see statutory law) by the ruling entities and were not necessarily well inter-related or self-consistent.

The history of measurement systems in Pakistan begins in early Indus Valley civilization with the earliest surviving samples dated to the 5th millennium BCE. The Mughal empire (1526–1857) used standard measures to determine land holdings and collect land tax as a part of Mughal land reforms. British units of measurement were adopted in South Asia as first the East India Company and later colonial rule gained foothold. The formal Metrication in Pakistan is dated to October 1967 when the Government of Pakistan adopted the International System of Units (SI)

Distance units
Kos is an ancient unit of distance used in South Asia which is about 2.25 miles. Kos may also refer to about 1.8 km (1⅛ mile) or 3.2 km (2 miles). The Mughal Empire used Farsang (Parsang) for distance, which was in principle the distance a horse would walk in an hour, about 3 miles = 12,000 cubits.

Area units 
A Kanal is a unit of area, equivalent to 5445 square feet or one-eighth of an acre. It is mainly used in Punjab province of Pakistan. Under British rule the Marla and Kanal were standardized so that the Kanal equals exactly 605 square yards or 1/8 acre; this is equivalent to about 505.857 square meters. A Kanal is equal to 20 marlas. The Marla (unit) is a traditional unit of area that was used in Pakistan and Marla was standardized under British rule to be equal to the square rod, or 272.25 square feet, 30.25 square yards, or 25.2929 square metres. As such, it was exactly one 160th of an acre.

Time units 
Paher, is a traditional unit of time used in South Asia, including Pakistan.  One pahar nominally equals three hours, and there are eight pahars in a day. The timing of Salat (Namaz) were also used to measure time of the day.

Weight units 
The traditional system is still used in the villages and remote areas of Pakistan.

The current definitions as per the UN are:

See also
 Metrication in Pakistan
 History of science and technology in Pakistan

External links
 THE PUNJAB WEIGHTS AND MEASURES ENFORCEMENT RULES, 1976

References

History of science and technology in Pakistan
Social history of Pakistan
Standards organisations in Pakistan